Witch from Nepal (奇緣) is a 1986 Hong Kong supernatural film directed by Ching Siu-tung. The film stars Chow Yun-fat as Joe Wong, an architect on vacation in Nepal with his girlfriend, Ida (Yammie Lam). Joe injures his leg as in a hospital where he has dreams of a beautiful woman with magical powers. Joe is later in a hospital in Hong Kong with his leg infected, finding that the woman from his visions named Sheila (Emily Chu) magically heals him. Sheila is a good witch who gets Joe to return to Nepal to fight a cat-like demon with supernatural powers.

The film was part of a trend of supernatural film productions from Hong Kong about Chinese tourists in exotic South Asian locations. It grossed $4.2 million Hong Kong dollars on its theatrical run in Hong Kong. The film was nominated for two awards at the 6th Hong Kong Film Awards, where director Chin Siu-tung won the Best Action Choreography Award.

Plot
While on vacation in Nepal, Joe Wong (Chow Yun-fat) and his girlfriend, Ida (Yammie Lam), ride an elephant when Joe falls and hurts his knee and is sent to a hospital. In a local hospital, Joe has visions of a beautiful veiled woman with mystical powers. Joe's leg later becomes infected and he finds himself in a hospital in Hong Kong, and finds the woman from his dreams earlier named Sheila (Emily Chu) magically healing his legs and granting him superhuman powers such as the ability to make large leaps through the air. Sheila reveals to Joe that she is a witch and that he has become a chosen one, to help defeat a demon for a Himalayan tribe who had their temple destroyed by the creature. Joe and Sheila begin to have an affair. Joe eventually meets up with the demon (Dick Wei) and the two have a clash at a temple. Sheila eventually sacrifices herself to save both Joe and Ida.

Production
Witch from Nepal was director Ching Siu-tung's second film as a director after Duel to the Death (1983).

Style
Witch from Nepal follows a trend of Hong Kong films at the time to have a plot about Chinese tourists in exotic South Asian locations such as Nepal, Thailand or Borneo such as The Seventh Curse. The film is a mixture of genres that include gothic horror, romance, comedy and mystery.

Release
Witch from Nepal was released in Hong Kong on 27 February 1986. grossed a total of HK$4,285,113 The film has been released under several different English titles including The Nepal Affair, Affair from Nepal and A Touch of Love.

Reception
At the 6th Hong Kong Film Awards, the film was nominated for Best Art Direction (James Leung) and Best Film Editing (Peter Cheung). Ching Siu-tung (Along with other three choreographers such as Philip Kwok, Alan Chui Chung-San and Lau Chi Hou) won the award for Best Action Choreography, beating other films nominees including Righting Wrongs and Peking Opera Blues.

Notes

References

External links
 
 

1986 films
1986 action films
1986 martial arts films
1986 horror films
1980s romance films
Hong Kong action films
Hong Kong martial arts films
Hong Kong horror films
Hong Kong romance films
Martial arts horror films
Hong Kong supernatural horror films
Romantic horror films
Golden Harvest films
1980s Cantonese-language films
Films directed by Ching Siu-tung
Films set in Nepal
Films shot in Nepal
Films set in Hong Kong
Films shot in Hong Kong
1980s Hong Kong films